Kari Skogland is a Canadian filmmaker. In 2016, she co-founded independent production company Mad Rabbit. Her most recent project is the Falcon and the Winter Soldier television series for Marvel Studios.

Career
Skogland started as an editor. Then she moved on to directing, starting with award-winning television commercials and music videos. Then she became a director of television shows, beginning with an episode of 1994's Dead at 21 and five episodes of 1996's Traders. Traders was nominated for several Geminis including Best Director, and won Best Series.

Her first film, The Size of Watermelons won the Silver Award at WorldFest Houston. Her CBC film White Lies was nominated for several Geminis and an International Emmy and won a Tout Ecran. She also directed 50 Dead Men Walking starring Sir Ben Kingsley, Jim Sturgess and Rose McGowan in March 2009. She directed episodes of Boardwalk Empire, The Borgias and in 2014 the miniseries Sons of Liberty and episodes of the History Channel's Vikings. In 2017 and 2018, she directed several memorable episodes of Hulu's original series, The Handmaid's Tale, including the Season 1 finale. She described her process for directing the show as, "Communication, curiosity and being open to an outcome that is different from what I have planned."

Skogland has spoken out about the glass ceiling for women directors in the film industry. Speaking about the production of The Handmaid's Tale in 2018, she said, "People say they can’t find female directors, but the reason for that is there’s no access, no entry point. They don’t appear overnight—you have to create a space where they can grow and be discovered."

In 2021, Skogland was announced as the new director for the upcoming Cleopatra biopic starring Gal Gadot, replacing Patty Jenkins who will still produce the film. In November 2022, Skogland signed on to direct a sequel to Wind River.

Personal life
Born in Ottawa, Ontario, Canada, Kari Skogland is married to film editor Jim Munro. They met circa 1979 when Skogland applied to be Munro's assistant, which led to Skogland getting the job and the two also starting a personal relationship. They have two daughters, MacKenzie and Aislin.

Filmography

Film

Television 
TV series

TV movie

References

External links
 
 
 
 
 Kari Skogland on Directors Guild of Canada

Canadian women film directors
20th-century Canadian screenwriters
Canadian women screenwriters
Canadian television directors
Canadian women film producers
Canadian television producers
Film directors from Ontario
Film directors from Ottawa
Canadian women television directors
Writers from Ottawa
Living people
Year of birth missing (living people)
Best Screenplay Genie and Canadian Screen Award winners
Canadian women television producers
20th-century Canadian women writers
21st-century Canadian screenwriters
21st-century Canadian women writers